José Ramos (born 9 November 1994) is a judoka from Guatemala. He represented his country at the 2016 Summer Olympics in the Men's 60 kg event, but lost to Tsogtbaataryn Tsend-Ochir of Mongolia by ippon in the first round.

He has qualified to represent Guatemala at the 2020 Summer Olympics.

References

External links
 
 
 

Living people
1994 births
Guatemalan male judoka
Olympic judoka of Guatemala
Judoka at the 2016 Summer Olympics
Judoka at the 2020 Summer Olympics
People from Cobán